Kalateh-ye Abbas Javini (also Romanized as Kalāteh-ye ʿAbbās Javīnī; also known as Kalāteh-ye Javīnī) is a village in Ghazi Rural District, Samalqan District, Maneh and Samalqan County, North Khorasan Province, Iran. At the 2006 census, its population was 89, in 27 families.

References 

Populated places in Maneh and Samalqan County